The Matabitchuan River is a river in Nipissing and Timiskaming Districts, Ontario, Canada.

Hydrology
It flows northeast over Rabbit Lake Dam and through Rabbit Chute to take in the left tributary Lorrain Creek. Highway 567 leads from the community of North Cobalt (in Temiskaming Shores) to the nearby Lower Notch generating station.

See also
List of rivers of Ontario

References

Sources

Rivers of Timiskaming District
Rivers of Nipissing District